The 1971 season in Swedish football, starting April 1971 and ending November 1971:

Honours

Official titles

Notes

References 
Online

 
Seasons in Swedish football